The 2015 FIRS Roller Hockey World Cup U-20 was the 7th edition of the FIRS Roller Hockey World Cup U-20. It was held in September 2015 in Vilanova, Spain.

Portugal won its third title, the same as Spain.

Group stage

Group A

Group B

Group C

Group D

Knockout stage

Championship

Games
Quarter-Final

5th-8th place

9th-16th place

13th-16th place

Final standing

References

External links
FIRS website
Real Federación Española de Patinaje website
Official website of the Championship

FIRS Roller Hockey World Cup U-20
R
2015 FIRS U-20 World Cup
2015 in Spanish sport